Neo or NEO may refer to:

Arts and entertainment

Fictional entities
 Neo (The Matrix), the alias of Thomas Anderson, a hacker and the protagonist of the Matrix film series
 Neo (Marvel Comics species), a fictional race of superhumans
 Neo Saiba , a character from Digimon Adventure V-Tamer 01
 Mettaton NEO, a character in Undertale
 Spamton NEO, a character in Deltarune
 NEO, a character from Digimon Next
 Neo, short for Neopolitan, a character from the animated series RWBY

Music
 N.E.O. (band), a Lithuanian band
 Neo (British band), a post-punk band
 Neo (Hungarian band), a Hungarian group
 Neo (Italian band), a prog-jazz group
 Ne Obliviscaris, sometimes abbreviated NeO, an Australian heavy metal band
 Neo (album), a 1979 album by Ian North
 NCT (band), Neo Culture Technology, a K-pop boy band
"N.E.O.", a song by Chai
"Power of "NEO"", a song by Toby Fox in the video game Undertale

Other entertainment
 Neo (magazine), an anime, manga and Asian film magazine published in the UK
 Neo (nightclub), a Chicago nightclub opened in 1979
 PlayStation 4 Pro (codename Neo), a high end version of the PlayStation 4 console

Science and technology
 Near-Earth object, a Solar System object whose orbit brings it into close proximity with the Earth
 Neomycin, an antibiotic

Computing
 Neo (keyboard), a portable keyboard by AlphaSmart
 Neo (keyboard layout), an ergonomic keyboard layout
 NEO (cryptocurrency) (Symbol: NEO), a cryptocurrency and blockchain platform
 Neo 1973, smartphone running Openmoko software
 .NEO, the file extension for computer images in the NEOchrome format
 Neo (French law enforcement agencies mobile terminals) and NeoGend, a project of secure smartphones and tablets for the French National Police and gendarmerie
 NEO, software products based on Sun Microsystems' Project Distributed Objects Everywhere
 Surface Neo, an upcoming foldable phone created by Microsoft.

Transportation
 Nissan Ecology Oriented or NEO VVL, an automobile variable valve timing technology
 New Engine Option, fuel-efficient re-engined versions of certain Airbus aircraft:
 Airbus A320neo family
 Airbus A330neo
 Proton Satria Neo, an automotive brand
 Youngcopter Neo, a German helicopter design

People
 NEO (Counter-Strike player) (born 1987), screen name of Polish professional Counter-Strike player Filip Kubski
 Neo Rauch (born 1960), German artist
 Jack Neo (born 1960), Singaporean actor, host, and director
 August Neo (1908–1982), Estonian wrestler

Other uses
 Revised NEO Personality Inventory, a psychometric instrument
 Neo (constructed language), a constructed language created by Arturo Alfandari
 Neo, Vietnam, a former township in Bac Giang Province, Vietnam
 NEO Exchange, a Canadian stock exchange

 New European Order, a neo-fascist Europe-wide alliance set up in 1951 to promote Pan-European nationalism
 Non-combatant evacuation operation, an operation conducted to evacuate a country's civilians from another country
 Neo, the Hokkien/Teochew form of the Chinese family name Liang
 an abbreviation for Northeastern Oklahoma A&M College

See also
 NEO Scavenger, a 2014 survival video game released on PC
 Neos (disambiguation)
 Ne-Yo (born 1979), American pop and R&B singer-songwriter
 Nio, two wrath-filled and muscular guardians of the Buddha
 NIO (disambiguation)